St George, an electoral district of the Legislative Assembly in the Australian state of New South Wales was created in 1894 and abolished in 1904.


Election results

Elections in the 1920s

1927

1925 appointment
Thomas Ley resigned to successfully contest the federal seat of Barton at the 1925 election. Between 1920 and 1927 the Legislative Assembly was elected using a form of proportional representation with multi-member seats and a single transferable vote (modified Hare-Clark). The Parliamentary Elections (Casual Vacancies) Act, provided that casual vacancies were filled by the next unsuccessful candidate on the incumbent member's party list. William Bagnall had the most votes of the unsuccessful  candidates at the 1925 election and took his seat on 30 September 1925.

1925

1922

1920

Elections in the 1910s

1917

1913

1910

Elections in the 1900s

1908 by-election

1907

1904

1901

Elections in the 1890s

1898

1895

1894

Notes

References

New South Wales state electoral results by district